Donora is a borough in Washington County, Pennsylvania, United States, approximately  south of Pittsburgh on the Monongahela River.

Donora was incorporated in 1901. It got its name from a combination of William Donner and Nora Mellon, banker Andrew W. Mellon's wife.  The borough's nickname is "The Home of Champions", mainly because of the large number of famous athletes who have called Donora their home, including Baseball Hall of Fame outfielders Stan Musial and Ken Griffey Jr.

Agriculture, coal-mining, steel-making, wire-making, and other industries were conducted in Donora early in its history.

In 1910, 8,174 people lived in Donora; in 1920, 14,131; and in 1940, 13,180. According to U.S. census figures, the population was 4,781 in 2010 and 4,558 in 2020.

Donora is a Rust Belt location which has lost most of its industrial capacity.

History

A trolley line opened in Donora on December 15, 1901, linking First and McKean, and Fifteenth Street and Meldon. It was extended in 1911 to Black Diamond to connect to the Charleroi to Pittsburgh interurban trolley. The line was abandoned on May 5, 1953.

The town was the scene of the infamous Donora Smog of 1948.  Between October 26 and October 31, 1948, an air inversion trapped industrial effluent (air pollution) from the American Steel and Wire plant and Donora Zinc Works. During this spike in air pollution, 6,000 people suffered respiratory problems and extreme discomfort. "In three days, 20 people died... After the inversion lifted, another 50 died, including Lukasz Musial, the father of baseball great Stan Musial. Hundreds more finished the rest of their lives with damaged lungs and hearts." The incident made national headlines. Today, the town is home to the Donora Smog Museum which tells the impact of the Donora Smog on the air quality standards enacted by the federal government in subsequent years.

Donora's neighborhood known as "Cement City" is listed on the National Register of Historic Places.  The homes built in the neighborhood are completely made out of pre-formed and poured concrete. This structural building technique was championed by Thomas Edison, and was used by neighborhoods throughout the United States. The homes were built as employee housing for the Donora Wire and Steel Mill in the early 1900s.

The Cement City Historic District and Webster Donora Bridge are also listed on the National Register of Historic Places.

The Borough of Donora and surrounding areas have also been utilized as the filming location for several films and television shows.  Most recently, the American television drama series American Rust starring Jeff Daniels and Maura Tierney used several sites in Donora for filming.

Geography
Donora is located at  (40.175879, −79.861264).

Climate
The climate in this area is characterized by hot, humid summers and generally mild to cool winters.  According to the Köppen Climate Classification system, Donora has a humid subtropical climate, abbreviated "Cfa" on climate maps.

Surrounding and adjacent neighborhoods
Donora is only bordered by land with Carroll Township to the north, south and west.  Across the Monongahela River to the east, Donora runs adjacent with Rostraver Township in Westmoreland County.

Government
Donora is a borough and consists of an elected mayor and an elected borough council.

For several decades, John "Chummy" Lignelli was the mayor of the Borough of Donora.  However, he recently resigned in order to better enjoy his retirement. Lignelli served for nearly three decades. At age 92 when he retired, he was one of the oldest seated mayors in the United States.

Mayor is Donald Pavelko.

Police Superintendent is Jim Brice

Chief of Police is Neil Rands.

Council President is Michael McDowell.

Schools
Donora is part of Ringgold School District, which includes the municipalities of Donora, Monongahela, Carroll Township, Nottingham Township, New Eagle, Finleyville, and Union Township.  As of 2011, the district no longer operates any facilities within the borough that house academic classrooms for students.

Donora's youth sports mascot is the Donora Dragon and its colors are orange and black. Since the merge of the elementary and middle schools, there is no longer Donora Dragon football or cheerleading.

Demographics

As of the census of 2000, there were 5,653 people, 2,469 households, and 1,434 families residing in the borough. The population density was 2,973.8 people per square mile (1,148.8/km2). There were 2,958 housing units at an average density of 1,556.1 per square mile (601.1/km2). The racial makeup of the borough was 82.10% White, 14.84% African American, 0.14% Native American, 0.27% Asian, 0.02% Pacific Islander, 0.32% from other races, and 2.32% from two or more races. Hispanic or Latino people of any race were 2.02% of the population.

There were 2,469 households, out of which 23.4% had children under the age of 18 living with them, 36.9% were married couples living together, 16.5% had a female householder with no husband present, and 41.9% were non-families. 37.4% of all households were made up of individuals, and 21.3% had someone living alone who was 65 years of age or older. The average household size was 2.23 and the average family size was 2.95.

In the borough the population was spread out, with 21.7% under the age of 18, 6.4% from 18 to 24, 25.5% from 25 to 44, 21.4% from 45 to 64, and 25.0% who were 65 years of age or older. The median age was 42 years. For every 100 females, there were 82.7 males. For every 100 females age 18 and over, there were 78.4 males.

The median income for a household in the borough was $27,939, and the median income for a family was $37,176. Males had a median income of $33,725 versus $22,346 for females. The per capita income for the borough was $17,893. About 12.4% of families and 16.8% of the population were below the poverty line, including 28.2% of those under age 18 and 14.0% of those age 65 or over.

Industry
Though many group Donora in a class of Western Pennsylvania towns and cities known collectively as the "rust belt" because of the demise of the once prolific steel industry, the town continues to be a center for industry and manufacturing.  On the site of the former steel mills now stands a large industrial park that is managed by MMIDA (Mid Mon Valley Industrial Development Authority).

Major companies that have facilities in the Donora Industrial Park include A-1 Babbit company, Apex N.A., Area Agency on Aging, Bergen Power Pipe Supports, BMA of Donora, HYTEC Inc., Dyno-Nobel Inc, Eastern Alloy, Eastern Hydraulic & Machine, Elizabeth Milling Corporation, Elliott Support Services, Glosser MFG, Industrial Nonferrous Casting Company, K-Z Tool Company, Airgas Specialty Products, Inc. (formerly LaRoche Industries), McGrew Welding Fabrication, Metalife Resources, MIDA Inc., Mon Valley Child Care, Mon Valley Sewage Authority, Monessen Ambulance Service, Nitrous Oxide Corporation, Power & Industrial Services Corporation, Nichols Miniatures, Pittsburgh Post Gazette Distribution Center, RAS Industries Inc., Regal Industries Inc.and Spartech Polycom.

Cement City
Donora is home to the world's second largest "Cement City" housing tract, innovated by Thomas Edison.  The Cement City Historic District consists of 80 "poured in place" homes.

Notable people
 Mary Amdur, scientist, investigated the 1948 Donora smog
 Robert Costanza, ecological economist
 Devra Davis, scientist, investigated the 1948 Donora smog
 Arnold Galiffa, All-American and professional football player
 Ken Griffey Jr., baseball player and Baseball Hall of Famer; his grandfather was Joseph "Buddy" Griffey, a local athlete who was a teammate of Stan Musial on the Donora High School baseball team
 Ken Griffey, Sr., baseball player; his father was Joseph "Buddy" Griffey, a local athlete who was a teammate of Stan Musial on the Donora High School baseball team
 Stan Musial, baseball player with the St. Louis Cardinals and Baseball Hall of Famer
 Reggie Walton, United States District Judge for the District of Columbia, appointed in 2001 by President George W. Bush

References

Further reading

University of Pittsburgh Archives Service Center, Bruce Drisbach-American Steel & Wire Company Photograph Collection (Donora, Pennsylvania, 1915-1917)

Boroughs in Washington County, Pennsylvania
Populated places established in 1900
Pennsylvania populated places on the Monongahela River